This is an incomplete filmography of Seijun Suzuki.

Film work as director

Partial television and video work as director

Partial film work as actor

References

External links
 Seijyun Suzuki at Kinenote
 Seijyun Suzuki at Movie Walker
 Seijyun Suzuki at eiga.com

Male actor filmographies
Director filmographies
 
Japanese filmographies